Charles Almanzo Babcock (1847 – 1922) was a late-nineteenth-century superintendent of schools in Oil City, Pennsylvania. He is credited with launching Bird Day, a day to celebrate birds in American schools, on May 4.  The first Bird Day was celebrated in Oil City schools in 1894, and by 1901 the practice was well established. His wife was the author Emma Whitcomb Babcock.

Works
Suggestions for Bird-Day Programs in Bird-Lore, Vol. I, (1899)
, (1901)

Notes

External links 
 
 
 C. A. Babcock at Wikisource.

1847 births
1922 deaths
School superintendents in Pennsylvania
People from Oil City, Pennsylvania